No Place is the third album by American post-hardcore band A Lot Like Birds, released October 29, 2013 through Equal Vision Records. It is also the last album to feature both Michael Littlefield and Kurt Travis before they left the band in 2016.

Background
The album tells a story of a narrator walking through an old house in which they used to live. Each song is about a different room. For example: No Nature is the basement, Next to Ungodliness is the bathroom, Hand Over Mouth, Over & Over is the bedroom, Recluse is the attic, etc.

Track listing

References

2013 albums
A Lot Like Birds albums
Equal Vision Records albums
Albums produced by Kris Crummett